Jüri-Mikk Udam (born 14 May 1994) is an Estonian rower. He competed in the men's double sculls event at the 2012 Summer Olympics.  He graduated Harvard University in 2017.

References

External links

1994 births
Living people
Estonian male rowers
Olympic rowers of Estonia
Rowers at the 2012 Summer Olympics
Rowers at the 2020 Summer Olympics
Sportspeople from Tallinn
Harvard Crimson rowers